The following is the list of members of Dewan Rakyat committees, which comprise Committee of Selection, House Committee, Standing Orders Committee, Committee of Privileges and Public Accounts Committee. The list of committee members from the first to the 13th Parliament, however, reflect those of Selection Committee only.

15th Parliament

Committee of Selection

House Committee

Standing Orders Committee

Committee of Privileges

14th Parliament

Committee of Selection

House Committee

Standing Orders Committee

Committee of Privileges

Public Accounts Committee

13th Parliament

12th Parliament

11th Parliament

10th Parliament

9th Parliament

8th Parliament

7th Parliament

6th Parliament

5th Parliament

4th Parliament

3rd Parliament

2nd Parliament

1st Parliament

References

External links
Parliament of Malaysia

Malaysian parliaments

Lists of members of the Parliament of Malaysia